Arsenophonus is a genus of Morganellaceae, of the Gammaproteobacteria. Members of the Arsenophonus genus are increasingly discovered bacterial symbionts of arthropods that are estimated to infect over 5% of arthropod species globally  and form a variety of relationships with hosts across the mutualism parasitism continuum. Arsenophonus bacteria have been identified in a diversity of insect taxa, including economically important species such as the Western honey bee and the rice pest Nilaparvata lugens.

The majority of work on Arsenophonus has been done on the type species Arsenophonus nasoniae for which genetic manipulation has been successful in achieving in vivo tracking of the bacterium. Arsenophonus nasoniae infects Nasonia parasitic wasps, is vertically transmitted through eggs, and has a male-killing phenotype. Infection with Arsenophonus nasoniae triggers the death of approximately 80% of the wasps male offspring. Killing male offspring is thought to facilitate the spread of Arsenophonus through the host population as it releases more resources to female offspring, and it is the female line that Arsenophonus is transmitted through.

Within the genus a number of Arsenophonus strains have known roles as mutualistic endosymbionts. In both Pediculus humanus and Lipoptena cervi Arsenophonus symbionts are essential to host functioning and are involved in vitamin synthesis, and are vertically transmitted across host generations. In other hosts Arsenophonus is suspected to be parasitic. In the Western honey bee Arsenophonus can be horizontally transmitted via social behaviour, and the presence of Arsenophonus in a colony has been linked to poor bee health.  The majority of associations between Arsenophonus and host taxa remain uncharacterized.

References

Further reading

External links 
LPSN

Monotypic bacteria genera
Bacteria genera